"Yeh, Yeh" (in some territories released as "Yeah, yeh, yeh") is a Latin soul tune that was written as an instrumental by Rodgers Grant and Pat Patrick, and first recorded by Mongo Santamaría on his 1963 album Watermelon Man! Lyrics were written for it shortly thereafter by Jon Hendricks of the vocal group Lambert, Hendricks & Ross.

This version of the song was taken to the top of the UK Singles Chart in January 1965 by Georgie Fame and the Blue Flames (b/w "Preach and Teach", Columbia DB 7428), breaking The Beatles' long-term hold on the number one spot of five weeks with "I Feel Fine", and a month later appeared on the US Billboard pop singles chart to peak at #21. The US single edited out the saxophone solo break. Interviewed after the 2003 Jools Holland Spring Hootennany, where he had played a "dynamite version" of the song, Fame explained that the arrangement had been written by Tubby Hayes.

Matt Bianco cover
British band Matt Bianco covered the song in 1985; their rendition reached number 13 in the UK Singles Chart. The single version was then included in their second eponymous album in 1986, while the CD edition of the album only contained its 12" Dance Mix. Both versions featured on the MC edition of the long playing work, depending upon the various countries. The version also peaked at number 64 in Australia in 1986.

References

1963 songs
1964 singles
1985 singles
Georgie Fame songs
Matt Bianco songs
UK Singles Chart number-one singles
RPM Top Singles number-one singles
Songs with lyrics by Jon Hendricks
Columbia Graphophone Company singles